Hacheza of Ballenstedt (died 1063) was a member of the House of Ascania, and the third abbess of Gernrode (r.1044-1063).

Life
Hacheza was a member of the House of Ascania. Her parents are sometimes said to have been Adalbert of Ballenstedt and Hidda, daughter of Margrave Odo I of the Saxon Eastern March, although there is no direct evidence for this. If so, Hacheza had at least two siblings: Esico of Ballenstedt, Uta von Ballenstedt, who married Margrave Eckhard II of Meissen. She may have also had two other brothers, Ludolf, who became a monk at Corvey, and Dietrich, provost of Ballenstedt. Esico’s great-grandson, Albert the Bear, is the first documented advocate of the abbey of Gernrode. From this point onwards, until the dissolution of the abbey, members of the Askanier dynasty held the advocacy of Gernrode.

Hacheza was the successor of Abbess Adelaide I. Under her rule, the abbey increased its possessions through many donations.

According to the 'Annals of Gernrode' (Annales Gernrodensis), written by the chronicler Andreas Popperodt in the sixteenth century, Hacheza was abbess of Gernrode for nineteen years. She is, however, only attested as abbess in two imperial diplomas from February 1044 and February 1046.

Hacheza’s brother-in-law, Eckhard II of Meissen, also made a large donation to Gernrode before his death, because his marriage to Hacheza’s sister, Uta, had remained childless. Eckhard’s donation was confirmed by Henry III in February 1046. The donation included property in Gundersleve, in Westerhausen, where  Gernrode already had possessions, and in Wendhusen, now in the district of Thale, as well as abandoned villages near Wegeleben, in Mordorf and Richbrechtigerode, both near Blankenburg, and Egihardingerode and Dorbonrod, whose modern locations are unknown.

Notes

References 
Schlenker, Gerlinde, Kloster Ballenstedt - das Hauskloster der aelteren Grafen von Anhalt, in Harz-Zeitschrift für den Harz-Verein für Geschichte und Altertumskunde e.V., Lukas Verlag (2012)
Feicker, Bernd, Das Vorwek des Reichsstiftes Gernrode und das Kuechengut der Blankenburger, in Harz-Zeitschrift für den Harz-Verein für Geschichte und Altertumskunde e.V., Lukas Verlag (2012)
 Andreas Popperodt: Historia Ecclesiae Gerenrodenses, in J.C. Bekmann, ed., Accesiones Historia Anhaltinae als Annales Gernrodensis. 1716.
 Hans Hartung: Zur Vergangenheit von Gernrode. Verlag Carl Mittag, Gernrode 1912.
 H. Bresslau and P. Kehr, eds., Die Urkunden Heinrichs III.  (Berlin, 1931).

External links
Dokumentation der Ausstellung SchleierHaft

House of Ascania
People from the Duchy of Saxony
Year of birth unknown
11th-century German abbesses
1063 deaths